Alex Bernard (born Albert Alexandre Bernard , March 11, 1882 – August 20, 1968) was a French silent film actor.

Biography 
Bernard was born in March 11, 1882 in Paris. He is best known for acting in silent films like Cabiria directed by Giovanni Pastrone (1914) and Cyrano de Bergerac by Augusto Genina (1925). He also appeared in sound films from the 1930s. He died in August 20, 1968 in Neuilly-sur-Seine.

Featured filmography  
 Cabiria
 Cyrano de Bergerac
 The House of Pulcini
 Company and the Crazy
 Miss Europe
 Little Lise
 The Darling of Paris
 Kameradschaft
 Once Upon a Time
 La Maternelle

References

External links

French male actors
1968 deaths
1882 births